David Hunter Diamont (born February 9, 1946) is an American football coach and politician. He served as a Democratic member of the North Carolina House of Representatives.

Life and career 
Diamont was born in Greensboro, North Carolina. He attended East Surry High School, Frank L. Ashley High School, Wake Forest University and Appalachian State University.

In 1975, Diamont was elected to the North Carolina House of Representatives, serving for twenty years.

Diamont was an assistant football coach at Mount Airy Senior High School. He was also a coach at East Surry High School. He retired in 2018.

References 

1946 births
Living people
Politicians from Greensboro, North Carolina
Democratic Party members of the North Carolina House of Representatives
20th-century American politicians
Wake Forest University alumni
Appalachian State University alumni
High school football coaches in North Carolina